The following is an episode list for the Disney Channel sitcom, The Suite Life of Zack & Cody, which aired from March 18, 2005, to September 1, 2008.

Series overview

Episodes

Season 1 (2005–06)

Season 2 (2006–07)

Season 3 (2007–08)

See also 
 List of The Suite Life on Deck episodes
 List of That's So Raven episodes - includes "Checkin' Out", part one of 'That's So Suite Life of Hannah Montana' crossover
 List of Hannah Montana episodes - includes "On the Road Again", part three of 'That's So Suite Life of Hannah Montana' crossover

References 

General references

External links 
 
 List of The Suite Life of Zack & Cody episodes at Zap2it
 List of The Suite Life of Zack & Cody episodes at AOL Television
 List of The Suite Life of Zack & Cody episodes at Yahoo! TV

 
Suite Life of Zack and Cody
Lists of Disney Channel television series episodes
Lists of American children's television series episodes

it:Zack e Cody al Grand Hotel#Episodi